Jonuk may refer to:
 Jonuk, Kerman
 Jonuk, Sistan and Baluchestan